Ed Gein, The Musical is a comedic musical film about the grave robbing serial killer Ed Gein. It premiered in Wisconsin in January 2010 and starred Dan Davies, who also co-produced and wrote the screenplay. It was directed by Steve Russell. The film aired on PBS and the Retro TV Network.

References

American musical films
Biographical musicals
Biographical plays about criminals
Cultural depictions of Ed Gein
Films set in the 1950s
Films set in Wisconsin
Plays set in the 1950s
Plays set in the United States
Wisconsin culture